Chitra Narayanan is a diplomat from India. She served as an Indian Foreign Service officer and as an ambassador of India to six countries.

Career
Chitra started her career as a journalist at the Press Institute of India. She was the founder-editor and co-publisher of The Book Review, the first English speaking journal in India dedicated to books. She joined the Indian Foreign Services at age 26, in 1978. She was the Deputy Director of Foreign Service Institute from 1988–91. She serves as a fellow at Institute of Contemporary Studies, Nehru Museum and Library, New Delhi from  1995 to 2000. She served as the ambassador of India to Sweden and Latvia (2001–2005), Turkey (2005–2008), Switzerland and Liechtenstein (2008–2013) and the Holy See (Vatican) (2009–2013). She is an associate fellow at the Geneva Center of Security Policy and Course Director of the executive course on Creative Diplomacy which teaches creative leadership and decision making skills relevant to the challenges of today.

Personal life
Chitra is the daughter of the former President of India, K.R Narayanan and Usha Narayanan. Due to the nature of the job of her father as an Indian Foreign Service officer, she got to do her schooling in different parts of the world, including in London, Australia, at a boarding school in the Himalayas and in New Delhi. She was homeschooled for one and a half years in Hanoi. She then completed her undergraduation in political science and postgraduation in international relations specializing in Chinese politics at Delhi University. She has a daughter, Chandrika, who is a writer and arts manager living in Dublin. She has a sister Amrita who lives in The Hague.

References

Living people
People from Delhi
Year of birth missing (living people)
Indian women ambassadors
Delhi University alumni
Indian people of Burmese descent
Ambassadors of India to Sweden
Ambassadors of India to Latvia
Ambassadors of India to Turkey
Ambassadors of India to Switzerland
Ambassadors of India to the Holy See